Brockhall  may refer to:
 Brockhall Village, Lancashire, England, home to the training ground of Blackburn Rovers FC
 Brockhall, Northamptonshire, England, a village